Cultural Amnesia (CA) are an English post-punk music group, first active between 1979 and 1983 as participants in the so-called cassette culture of the late 1970s and early 1980s in the UK. During this first period the band released three cassette albums: Video Rideo (1981), The Uncle of the Boot (1983) and Sinclair's Luck (1983) on English and German record labels, and contributed to a number of compilation albums. Early on in his career, CA worked with the late Geff Rushton (John Balance) of Coil, who wrote a handful of songs for them and who was an important supporter and enabler due to his contacts as editor of Stabmental magazine, arranging most of their releases and providing constant encouragement. The band has become more widely known since 2000 following release of a number of compilations of their early '80s music in which the members of the group have been fully involved. Since the late '90s the band has also been occasionally active in the recording of new music and there have been a number of releases of new material since the early 2000s.

Working in the wake of the early industrial bands, CA's output is diverse, ranging from ambient soundscapes to synthpop, but it can be broadly characterized as song-based electronic music, normally making use of synthesizer, drum machine and guitar. The three members of the band were occasionally joined for recording and live performance by guitarist, Alastair Murray. The band’s methods of recording, as with many of those involved with the cassette/DIY scene of the post-punk period, were initially extremely primitive, growing more sophisticated as they could afford better equipment. However, CA never recorded in a professional studio of any kind. The members of the band had little interest in punk, but in addition to the inspiration of bands such as Throbbing Gristle and Cabaret Voltaire they enjoyed a broad range of music of the post-punk period; they also listened a great deal to the art rock of the late '60s and '70s, including Krautrock and progressive rock, and had a keen interest in dance music and disco.

Cultural Amnesia stopped activity close to the completion of what was to be their first vinyl LP, Obscenity, with the German company Datenverarbeitung. John Balance's sleeve notes for the unreleased album give a perceptive insight into CA’s body of work (the blurb was published on the inner sleeve of the 2007 compilation LPs, Press My Hungry Button).

What does one say? Cultural Amnesia have never ceased to amaze me with their finely honed songs of innocence and insecticide. Each gleaming tune a button on their hair shirt. There is a raw spirit of experiment, of mis-adventure with emotions, that is almost awkward to listen to. Time shifts and personal twists reveal a complex web of older children, playing with something they know full well is not really for the general public. Using a vocabulary of myths and symbols, along with splintered shards of themselves, caricatures and alter egos weave and parade in drunken 'night on the town' scenarios, in crazy-glass-house confrontations with each other. All life is here. Bitter and sweet. Love, sex behind supermarkets, truth and lies, jealousy and an all-pervading earthy magick. And Death. Having lurked in the herbaceous borders of the DIY cassette scene, earning critical acclaim for their numerous releases, this record now marks the edge of that dark, tangled frustration of a country. Beyond... is another day. – John Balance, the Ides of March 1983

After fifteen years of silence the band produced three new tracks in 1998, and in 2003 launched a website. Their resumption of activity coincided with renewed interest in what has become known as 'cassette culture' and the emergence of specialist labels, of which Vinyl On Demand is the best known, dedicated to reissuing on LP and CD material originally released on cassette in the late 1970s and early '80s. Having launched a website in 2003, the band began to receive inquiries from labels. Enormous Savages, a compilation of material from 1981–1983, was released on LP in the summer of 2007, early sales accompanied by a four-track mini-CD of material recorded 1998–2006. Press My Hungry Button, a 30-track double-LP compilation of 1980–1983 material, was released November 2007, early sales accompanied by a four-track EP of further 1980s material. The CD Enormous Savages Enlarged, from April 2009, includes five tracks recorded 2004–09 and a further '80s track in addition to the material that appeared on the LP. These compilations of 1980s material were well received in print and online, with Enormous Savages described in The Sound Projector as "a remarkable piece of musical archaeology and certainly one of the reissues of the year". In November 2011 the band released This Is Not Your Shape, their first full album of new material since the early 1980s. The album was accompanied by a highly designed A4 lyrics booklet, Verbose Logging, including the songs on the album and others recorded during their second period. A special-edition CD of the album was released September 2012, with an additional track, booklet, postcards and a lapel badge. Two further albums and two EPs of new material have been released since then. A number of videos for both new and old material have been produced by John Peacock of the band. (Please see the discography below for further information and references.)

Although the 2007 compilation LPs collected many of the best of the band's 1980s recordings, a considerable amount of material remains unreleased. The CA website is an extensive source of information on the band's output, released and unreleased, and on the early-'80s milieu in which they were first active.

John Peacock and Ben Norland (the latter as themilgramobediencetoauthorityexperiment (sic)) are active as solo artists.

Discography

Albums and EPs
Video Rideo (Cassette, Conventional Tapes 1981, Datenverarbeitung 1983)
Sinclair's Luck (Cassette, Hearsay and Heresy 1983)
The Uncle of the Boot (Cassette, Datenverarbeitung 1983)
The Undertow of Evening (Recorded 1982/3, unreleased)
Obscenity (Recorded 1982/3, unreleased)
Enormous Savages (LP, 1980s compilation, Anna Logue Records 2007)
Little Savage (Mini-CD EP, Iron Banana 2007)
Press My Hungry Button (2xLP, 1980s compilation, VOD Records 2007)
Still Hungry (EP, 1980s compilation, VOD Records 2007)
Enormous Savages Enlarged (CD, 1980s compilation + five post-2000 tracks, Klanggalerie 2009)
This Is Not Your Shape (File album, Bleak 2011)
This Is Not Your Shape special edition (CD, Bleak 2012)
Bad Meditation (File album, Bleak 2015)
Ring The Hungry Bell (File EP, 1980s compilation, Bleak 2016)
Agile Business Practices (File EP, Bleak 2016)
Laments (File EP, Bleak 2016)
Super Whippy (File album, Bleak 2017)

Compilation appearances
"Yellow Song" on Standard Response (1979)
"Cyberforms Dub" on Snatch 2 (1980)
"Repetition For This World", "Reprise", "Dialogue of Skull And Soul" and "Secrets of the Passive Margin" on Endzeit (1982)
"Colorblind" and "The Pigs Are Coming" on A Sudden Surge of Power (1983)
"Nobody Does It Like You Do!" on Qu'est-ce Qu'il Y A? (1983)
"Resthome (The Man Who Worked With Tourists)" on Rising From The Red Sand (Volume Four) (1983)
"Kingdom Come" on The Angels Are Coming (1983)
"The Uncle of the Boot" on Band-It 11 (1983)
"Dance" and "Where Has All The Difference Gone?" on The Best of the Rest (Volume 27/28) (1984/5)
"Where Has All The Difference Gone?" on On-Slaught No. 6 (1985)
"Down by the Canal" on Cassette Culture I: Pause And Rewind (2005)
"Contains" on Cassette Culture II (2006)
"I Am Taking Photographs" on Electricity 3 (2006)
"Resthome (The Man Who Worked With Tourists)" on Nonpop 2 (2008)
"Repetition For This World" on Messthetics Greatest Hiss: Classics of UK Cassette-Culture DIY, 1979-1982 (volume 1) (2008)
"Materialistic Man" on The Anna Logue Years (2010)
"Little Blue Grains" and "Brand New Day" on Why Be Blake When You Can Be Bleak? (2010)
"Materialistic Man" on Close to the Noise Floor (4xCD, 2016)
"Materialistic Man" on Close to the Noise Floor (2xLP, 2017)

Discography sources: Discogs, Tape-Mag, culturalamnesia.com

See also
Electronic music
Industrial music
Post-punk
Cassette culture

Notes and references

External links
culturalamnesia.com
CA page at Tape-Mag
CA YouTube Official videos
themilgramobediencetoauthorityexperiment Solo project of Ben Norland of Cultural Amnesia
John Peacock Music by John Peacock of Cultural Amnesia

British experimental musical groups
Cassette culture 1970s–1990s
English electronic music groups
English post-punk music groups
Third Mind Records artists
British industrial music groups
British electronic musicians